Red spider flower is a common name for several plants and may refer to:

Grevillea oleoides
Grevillea speciosa

Grevillea taxa by common name